Minister of Foreign Affairs and Cooperation is a cabinet level position in the national government of Mozambique.

List of ministers
 1975–1987: Joaquim Chissano
 1987–1994: Pascoal Mocumbi
 1994–2005: Leonardo Simão
 2005–2008: Alcinda Abreu
 2008–2017: Oldemiro Balói
 2017–2020: José Condungua Pacheco
 2020–present: Verónica Macamo

External links
Official site
List of Ministers of Foreign Affairs of Mozambique

Foreign
Foreign Ministers
Politicians